Young Gypsy Woman is a painting by Kārlis Hūns from 1870. It is located in the Latvian National Museum of Art.

Genesis
The painting was created in the summer of 1870, when Hūns participated in the Paris salon, and afterwards went to Normandy and then Belgium, where this painting was created.

References 

1870 paintings
Latvian paintings
Paintings in Latvia
Musical instruments in art